In the scientific name of organisms, basionym or basyonym means the original name on which a new name is based; the author citation of the new name should include the authors of the basionym in parentheses. The term "basionym" is used in both botany and zoology. In zoology, alternate terms such as original combination or protonym are sometimes used instead. Bacteriology uses a similar term, basonym, spelled without an i.

Although "basionym" and "protonym" are often used interchangeably, they have slightly different technical definitions. A basionym is the correct spelling of the original name (according to the applicable nomenclature rules), while a protonym is the original spelling of the original name. These are typically the same, but in rare cases may differ.

Use in botany
The term "basionym" is used in botany only for the circumstances where a previous name exists with a useful description, and the International Code of Nomenclature for algae, fungi, and plants does not require a full description with the new name. A basionym must therefore be legitimate. Basionyms are regulated by the code's articles 6.10, 7.3, 41, and others.  

When a current name has a basionym, the author or authors of the basionym are included in parentheses at the start of the author citation.  If a basionym is later found to be illegitimate, it becomes a replaced synonym and the current name's author citation must be changed so that the basionym authors do not appear.

Combinatio nova 
The basionym of the name Picea abies (the Norway spruce) is Pinus abies. The species was originally named Pinus abies by Carl Linnaeus and so the author citation of the basionym is simply "L." Later on, botanist Gustav Karl Wilhelm Hermann Karsten decided this species should not be grouped in the same genus (Pinus) as the pines, so he transferred it to the genus Picea (the spruces). The new name Picea abies is combinatio nova, a new combination (abbreviated comb. nov.).  With author citation, the current name is "Picea abies (L.) Karst."

Status novus 
In 1964, the subfamily name Pomoideae, which had been in use for the group within family Rosaceae that have pome fruit like apples, was no longer acceptable under the code of nomenclature because it is not based on a genus name. Claude Weber did not consider the family name Malaceae Small to be taxonomically appropriate, so he created the name Maloideae at the rank of subfamily, referring to the original description of the family, and using the same type. This change of rank from family to subfamily is an example of status novus (abbreviated stat. nov.), also called a "name at new rank".

See also
 Glossary of scientific naming

References 

Biological nomenclature
Botanical nomenclature
Zoological nomenclature